Benmore is a ghost town in Tooele County, in the U.S. state of Utah.

History
A post office called Benmore was established in 1915, and remained in operation until 1935. The community's name is an amalgamation of Bennion and Moore, the surnames of the families of early settlers.

References

Ghost towns in Tooele County, Utah